The Digital Building Logbook is a proposal aiming at establishing a common European approach that aggregates all relevant data about a building and ensures that authorised people can access accurate information about the building.

See also 

 Energy performance certificate
 Building information modeling

References

Building engineering
Building information modeling